The Galápagos land iguanas comprise the genus Conolophus of the Galápagos Islands (Ecuador). The number of species of this variable genus has always been disputed; the most current taxonomic surveys suggest that three species exist:

Extant species

References
Frost, D.E. and R.E. Etheridge (1989) A Phylogenetic Analysis and Taxonomy of Iguanian Lizards (Reptilia: Squamata). Univ. Kansas Mus. Nat. Hist. Misc. Publ. 81
Frost, D.R.,  R. Etheridge, D. Janies and T.A. Titus (2001) Total evidence, sequence alignment, evolution of Polychrotid lizards, and a reclassification of the Iguania (Squamata: Iguania). American Museum Novitates 3343: 38 pp.

Notes

External links
 
 

 
Lizard genera
Taxa named by Leopold Fitzinger

it:Conolophus subcristatus
nl:Galapagos landleguaan